In mathematics, the mean value theorem (or Lagrange theorem) states, roughly, that for a given planar arc between two endpoints, there is at least one point at which the tangent to the arc is parallel to the secant through its endpoints. It is one of the most important results in real analysis. This theorem is used to prove statements about a function on an interval starting from local hypotheses about derivatives at points of the interval.

History 

A special case of this theorem for inverse interpolation of the sine was first described by Parameshvara (1380–1460), from the Kerala School of Astronomy and Mathematics in India, in his commentaries on Govindasvāmi and Bhāskara II. A restricted form of the theorem was proved by Michel Rolle in 1691; the result was what is now known as Rolle's theorem, and was proved only for polynomials, without the techniques of calculus. The mean value theorem in its modern form was stated and proved by Augustin Louis Cauchy in 1823. Many variations of this theorem have been proved since then.

Formal statement 

The mean value theorem is a generalization of Rolle's theorem, which assumes , so that the right-hand side above is zero.

The mean value theorem is still valid in a slightly more general setting.

If finite, that limit equals . An example where this version of the theorem applies is given by the real-valued cube root function mapping , whose derivative tends to infinity at the origin.

Note that the theorem, as stated, is false if a differentiable function is complex-valued instead of real-valued. For example, define  for all real  Then

while  for any real 

These formal statements are also known as Lagrange's Mean Value Theorem.

Proof
Thus the mean value theorem says that given any chord of a smooth curve, we can find a point on the curve lying between the end-points of the chord such that the tangent of the curve at that point is parallel to the chord. The following proof illustrates this idea.

Define , where  is a constant. We now want to choose  so that  satisfies the conditions of Rolle's theorem. Namely

Implications
Theorem 1: Assume that f is a continuous, real-valued function, defined on an arbitrary interval I of the real line. If the derivative of f at every interior point of the interval I exists and is zero, then f is constant in the interior.

Proof: Assume the derivative of f at every interior point of the interval I exists and is zero. Let (a, b) be an arbitrary open interval in I. By the mean value theorem, there exists a point c in (a, b) such that

This implies that . Thus, f is constant on the interior of I and thus is constant on I by continuity. (See below for a multivariable version of this result.)

Remarks: 
 Only continuity of f, not differentiability, is needed at the endpoints of the interval I.  No hypothesis of continuity needs to be stated if I is an open interval, since the existence of a derivative at a point implies the continuity at this point.  (See the section continuity and differentiability of the article derivative.)
 The differentiability of f can be relaxed to one-sided differentiability, a proof given in the article on semi-differentiability.
Theorem 2: If f' (x) = g' (x) for all x in an interval (a, b) of the domain of these functions, then f - g is constant, i.e. f = g + c where c is a constant on (a, b).

Proof: Let F = f − g, then F' = f' − g' = 0 on the interval (a, b), so the above theorem 1 tells that F = f − g is a constant c or f = g + c.

Theorem 3: If F is an antiderivative of f on an interval I, then the most general antiderivative of f on I is F(x) + c where c is a constant.

Proof: It directly follows from the theorem 2 above.

Cauchy's mean value theorem

Cauchy's mean value theorem, also known as the extended mean value theorem, is a generalization of the mean value theorem.

Geometrically, this means that there is some tangent to the graph of the curve

An example of this situation is the curve given by

Cauchy's mean value theorem can be used to prove L'Hôpital's rule. The mean value theorem is the special case of Cauchy's mean value theorem when .

Proof of Cauchy's mean value theorem
The proof of Cauchy's mean value theorem is based on the same idea as the proof of the mean value theorem.

Suppose . Define , where  is fixed in such a way that , namely

Now using the definition of  we have:

Therefore:

which implies the result.

Generalization for determinants
Define

There exists  such that .

Notice that

and if we place , we get Cauchy's mean value theorem. If we place  and  we get Lagrange's mean value theorem.

The Rolle's theorem implies that there exists  such that .

Mean value theorem in several variables 
The mean value theorem generalizes to real functions of multiple variables. The trick is to use parametrization to create a real function of one variable, and then apply the one-variable theorem.

Since  is a differentiable function in one variable, the mean value theorem gives:

where  denotes a gradient and  a dot product. Note that this is an exact analog of the theorem in one variable (in the case  this is the theorem in one variable). By the Cauchy–Schwarz inequality, the equation gives the estimate:

Pick some point , and let . We want to show  for every . For that, let . Then E is closed and nonempty. It is open too: for every  ,

Since  is connected, we conclude .

The above arguments are made in a coordinate-free manner; hence, they generalize to the case when  is a subset of a Banach space.

Mean value theorem for vector-valued functions 
There is no exact analog of the mean value theorem for vector-valued functions (see below). However, there is an inequality which can be applied to many of the same situations to which the mean value theorem is applicable in the one dimensional case:

The theorem follows from the mean value theorem. Indeed, take . Then  is real-valued and thus, by the mean value theorem,

Now,  and  Hence, using the Cauchy–Schwarz inequality, from the above equation, we get:

If , the theorem is trivial (any c works). Otherwise, dividing both sides by  yields the theorem. 

Jean Dieudonné in his classic treatise Foundations of Modern Analysis discards the mean value theorem and replaces it by mean inequality (which is given below) as the proof is not constructive and one cannot find the mean value and in applications one only needs mean inequality. Serge Lang in Analysis I uses the mean value theorem, in integral form, as an instant reflex but this use requires the continuity of the derivative. If one uses the Henstock–Kurzweil integral one can have the mean value theorem in integral form without the additional assumption that derivative should be continuous as every derivative is Henstock–Kurzweil integrable.

The reason why there is no analog of mean value equality is the following: If  is a differentiable function (where  is open) and if ,  is the line segment in question (lying inside ), then one can apply the above parametrization procedure to each of the component functions  of f (in the above notation set ). In doing so one finds points  on the line segment satisfying

But generally there will not be a single point  on the line segment satisfying

for all  simultaneously. For example, define:

The above theorem implies the following:

In fact, the above statement suffices for many applications and can be proved directly as follows. First assume  is differentiable at  too. Thus, assume . Let  be some real number. Let

We want to show . Hence, the set  has the largest element . If , then  and we are done. Thus suppose otherwise. For ,

Let  be such that . Hence,  and that means:

Since  is arbitrary, this then implies the assertion.

since . Letting  finishes the proof. 

For some applications of mean value inequality to establish basic results in calculus, see also Calculus on Euclidean space#Basic notions.

On the other hand, we have, by the fundamental theorem of calculus followed by a change of variables,

Thus, the value  at the particular point  has been replaced by the mean value

This last version can be generalized to vector valued functions:

Proof.

Then we have

 

The claim follows since  is the matrix consisting of the components . 

The mean value inequality can then be obtained as a corollary of the above proposition (though under the assumption the derivatives are continuous).

Cases where theorem cannot be applied (Necessity of conditions) 
Both conditions for Mean Value Theorem are necessary:

 f(x) is differentiable on (a,b) 
 f(x) is continuous on [a,b]

Where one of the above conditions is not satisfied, Mean Value Theorem is not valid in general, and so it cannot be applied.

Function is differentiable on open interval a,b

The necessity of the first condition can be seen by the counterexample where the function  on [-1,1] is not differentiable.

Function is continuous on closed interval a,b

The necessity of the second condition can be seen by the counterexample where the function 

 satisfies criteria 1 since  on  

Mean value theorems for definite integrals

First mean value theorem for definite integrals

Let f : [a, b] → R be a continuous function. Then there exists c in (a, b) such that

Since the mean value of f on [a, b] is defined as

we can interpret the conclusion as f achieves its mean value at some c in (a, b).

In general, if f : [a, b] → R is continuous and g is an integrable function that does not change sign on [a, b], then there exists c in (a, b) such that

Proof that there is some c in [a, b] 
Suppose f : [a, b] → R is continuous and g is a nonnegative integrable function on [a, b]. Since g is nonnegative,

Now let

If , we're done since

means

so for any c in (a, b),

If I ≠ 0, then

By the intermediate value theorem, f attains every value of the interval [m, M], so for some c in [a, b]

that is,

Finally, if g is negative on [a, b], then

and we still get the same result as above.

QED

Second mean value theorem for definite integrals
There are various slightly different theorems called the second mean value theorem for definite integrals. A commonly found version is as follows:

If G : [a, b] → R is a positive monotonically decreasing function and φ : [a, b] → R is an integrable function, then there exists a number x in (a, b] such that

Note that it is essential that the interval (a, b] contains b. A variant not having this requirement is:

If G : [a, b] → R is a monotonic (not necessarily decreasing and positive) function and φ : [a, b] → R is an integrable function, then there exists a number x in (a, b) such that

Mean value theorem for integration fails for vector-valued functions 

For example, consider the following 2-dimensional function defined on an -dimensional cube:

A probabilistic analogue of the mean value theorem
X is smaller than Y in the usual stochastic order). Then there exists an absolutely continuous non-negative random variable Z having probability density function

Let g be a measurable and differentiable function such that E[g(X)], E[g(Y)] < ∞, and let its derivative g′  be measurable and Riemann-integrable on the interval [x, y] for all y ≥ x ≥ 0. Then, E[g′(Z)] is finite and

Mean value theorem in complex variables 
As noted above, the theorem does not hold for differentiable complex-valued functions. Instead, a generalization of the theorem is stated such:

Let f : Ω → C be a holomorphic function on the open convex set Ω, and let a and b be distinct points in Ω. Then there exist points u, v on the interior of the line segment from a to b such that

Where Re() is the real part and Im() is the imaginary part of a complex-valued function.

See also: Voorhoeve index.

See also 
 Newmark-beta method
 Mean value theorem (divided differences)
 Racetrack principle
 Stolarsky mean

Notes

References

External links 
 
 PlanetMath: Mean-Value Theorem
 
 
 "Mean Value Theorem: Intuition behind the Mean Value Theorem" at the Khan Academy

Augustin-Louis Cauchy
Articles containing proofs
Theorems in calculus
Theorems in real analysis